A Cowboy Afraid of Horses is the fifth album by Lobo and his final album on Big Tree Records, released in 1975. The album, along with Just a Singer, was reissued in 1997 by Rhino Records as a single issue under the said title.

The album peaked at No. 151 on the US Top LPs chart, becoming his final album to chart to date. "Don't Tell Me Goodnight" peaked at No. 27 on the Billboard Hot 100, becoming his final Top 40 hit until 1979's "Where Were You When I Was Falling in Love".

Track listing
All songs are written by Kent LaVoie.

Personnel
Lobo – guitar, lead
Emory Gordy Jr. – bass
Jerry Scheff – bass
Ron Tutt – drums
Larry Carlton – guitar
Richard Bennett – guitar
Alan Lindgren – keyboards
Larry Knechtel – keyboards
King Errisson – congas

Production
Record producer: Phil Gernhard
Engineer: Michael Lietz
Photography: Craig Brown

Reception

Charts
Album

'''Singles

References

External links

1975 albums
Big Tree Records albums
Lobo (musician) albums